Edith Mary Watson (née Wall; 6 November 1888 – 25 March 1966) was a British suffragist, police officer and campaigner against Female Genital Mutilation in the 1930s.

Life
Watson was born in a workhouse in the London Borough of Hackney. Her mother was Martha Wall and she was an unmarried servant. At age fourteen she was employed as a nurse in South Africa. She formed her political ambitions when she was nearly raped by a fellow member of the Salvation Army. She left South Africa and the Salvation Army in 1909 and her allegiance moved to socialism. She married a Post Office worker named M??? Wall in 1912.

Watson had joined the Women's Freedom League in 1911. She continued the league's non-violent methods by writing for the left-wing Daily Herald under the title of Sketches in Green, Gold and White. She and Nina Boyle wrote for "The Vote", where they argued against the injustices of a male-dominated legal system. Women victims needed to be cared for by women police and courts should realise that they could not expect women to give evidence in a court that was a room full of men. Watson decided to document what she saw as unfair practise. She was employed as the Court correspondent for "The Vote" and she recorded the crimes or rape, sexual assault and incest ironically under the title of "The Protected Sex". She catalogued the sentences given to the perpetrators noting that prostitutes could get nine months for approaching clients whereas a man guilty of grievously harming a woman might get a third of the sentence. She started this in 1912 and continued for three years to compare the sentences with those handed down for loss or damage to property. Boyle and Watson went to Marlborough Street Police Court in 1914 and made a more militant protest. Watson was amongst other who were arrested for chaining themselves to the gates.

She was a campaigner against Female Genital Mutilation in the 1930s. She wanted to have the practice banned inside the British Empire.

Watson died in Worthing in 1966.

Archives
The archives of Edith Mary Watson can be found at the Library of the London School of Economics (ref 7EMW).

References

1888 births
1966 deaths
British women police officers
People from the London Borough of Hackney
British suffragists